The  Green Bay Blizzard season was the team's ninth season as a football franchise and second in the Indoor Football League. One of twenty-two teams competing in the IFL for the 2011 season, the Blizzard were members of the Great Lakes Division of the United Conference. The team played their home games at the Resch Center in the Green Bay suburb of Ashwaubenon, Wisconsin.

Preseason

Schedule

Regular season

Schedule

Standings

Postseason

Schedule

Roster

References

External links
Green Bay Blizzard official website
Green Bay Blizzard official statistics

Green Bay Blizzard seasons
Green Bay Blizzard
Sports in Green Bay, Wisconsin
Green Bay Blizzard